Ulrich Løvenskjold Larsen (born 14 September 1976) is an undercover mole who infiltrated North Korea (DPRK). He spent more than ten years infiltrating the Korean Friendship Association (KFA) between the years 2010–2021. In October 2020, Ulrich blew his own cover as a mole after exposing North Korea's weapons program, as well as procedures to circumvent international sanctions. 

During the infiltration, Ulrich teamed up with the award-winning Danish documentary film director Mads Brügger and managed to record plans of large-scale illegal weapon distributions, methamphetamine laboratories, and money laundering in the documentary series The Mole: Undercover in North Korea. The series later won "best documentary" at the Danish Robert Awards in 2021. 

Ulrich Larsen shares his story through speeches and lectures to raise awareness about North Korea and share his experience undercover.

Biography 
Ulrich 'The Mole' Løvenskjold Larsen (born 1976, Sealand, Denmark) is a retired chef who spent more than a decade infiltrating North Korea. Due to a chronic illness, Ulrich was forced into early retirement. He then decided to use his time to investigate the supporters of North Korea in Denmark. Posing as a loyal supporter of the North Korean regime, Ulrich Larsen initially started collaborating with the Danish North Korean Friendship Organization, subsequently rising through the ranks of the organization in Denmark and ending up in the inner circle of the International Friendship Association (KFA). Here, Ulrich gained the trust of some of North Korea's most influential supporters in the West. 

For several years, Ulrich was functioning as the official Scandinavian delegate of the KFA.

As part of Ulrich Larsen's undercover life, he traveled around Europe to fulfill his obligations within the KFA and became a well-known member of the international community. The documentary "The Mole: Undercover in North Korea" follows Ulrich's journey as a mole, working within the KFA. The filming of the documentary leads Ulrich to North Korea, and around the world, to initiate negotiations of cross-continental Scud missiles, weapons, and methamphetamine between North Korea and a fake businessman. This exposed how North Korea attempts to avoid the strict sanctions placed against the regime. The intelligence work done in the documentary has been recognized by United Nations who has shown interest in Ulrich Larsen's work. China has reportedly told the UN Panel of Experts that they do not accept the documentary about North Korean sanctions violations as a “credible source". 

Ulrich Larsen initiated a close relationship with the President of the International Friendship Association (KFA), Alejandro Cao de Benós, a special representative of the Foreign Ministry of North Korea who allegedly has direct contact with state officials in North Korea. After years of gaining his trust, Alejandro Cao de Benós entrusts Ulrich with secrets about North Korea and offers him confidential tasks.

Through covert recordings of negotiations between regime representatives and the fake businessman, the documentary shows how North Korea is ignoring United Nations (UN) sanctions to trade oil, drugs, and money. Later on, the documentary sees Ulrich reveal his true identity to Alejandro Cao de Benós and Ulrich's unsuspecting wife, for whom Ulrich's double life comes as shocking news.

Ulrich Larsen in the documentary 
The documentary The Mole: Undercover in North Korea is directed by Danish film director Mads Brügger. Brügger was contacted by Ulrich Larsen to make a documentary about his journey undercover, to serve as a sequel to the award-winning documentary The Red Chapel. In the documentary, Ulrich becomes the point of contact between North Korea and Mr. James, a fake businessman, acted by Jim Latrache-Qvortrup. Mr. James poses as a wealthy Norwegian businessman who is willing to initiate illegal business with North Korea. The two men travel around the world to meet with North Korean diplomats to negotiate a large illegal trade deal involving cross-continental missiles, weapons, and methamphetamine. 

The purpose of the scheme is to expose how North Korea is bypassing international sanctions, and initiating highly illegal activities outside of North Korea. The documentary premiered in Denmark, Norway, Sweden, and the United Kingdom on 11 October 2020, and was directed by the Danish Film-director Mads Brügger. Hugh Griffiths, who was co-coordinator of the UN Panel of Experts on North Korea between 2014 and 2019, called the revelations in the film "highly credible"."This film is the most severe embarrassment to chairman Kim Jong-un that we have ever seen," said Griffiths. 

Critics of Ulrich's work have said that it stretches beyond the limits of the documentary-genre, and that Ulrich and Mr. James needlessly put themselves in danger.

Personal life 
Ulrich grew up in southern Denmark, close to the German border. Before he left his job as a cook and documented his infiltration work, Ulrich lived with his family in a suburb of Copenhagen. Since the documentary was released, Ulrich Larsen has become an international keynote speaker. 

Ulrich has held lectures and speaking engagements as part of a nationwide speaking tour in Denmark. Ulrich and his family have been in a personal protection program since contact with the North Korean regime.

References 

Danish spies
Danish chefs
People from Region Zealand
1976 births
Living people